Edward Rosen (12 December 1906 – 28 March 1985) was an American historian, whose main field of study was early modern science and, in particular, the work of Copernicus, Galileo and Kepler.

Academic life
Edward Rosen's academic life, including his education, was spent in New York. He graduated from the City College of New York in 1926 and he received his master's (1929) and doctoral degrees (1939) from Columbia University. He was a teacher at the City College of New York and the Graduate Center of the City University of New York until his retirement in 1977, with two interruptions: he was a visiting professor at the Massachusetts Institute of Technology in 1957–1958, and at Indiana University in 1963–1964. In 1983, six years after his retirement, he was appointed Distinguished Professor Emeritus at the City University of New York.

In the course his career, Edward Rosen published 11 books, more than 160 articles, and over 90 book reviews.

Prizes
Pfizer Award of the History of Science Society in 1968, for his translation of Kepler's Somnium.
Medal from the Copernicus Society of America in 1973, for his many years of outstanding research and publication on the life and works of Nicholas Copernicus.
Gold Order of Merit from the Polish People's Republic in 1978, for the same reason.

References

Philip P. Wiener: "Remembering Edward Rosen", in: Journal of the History of Ideas, Vol. 47, No. 1 (Jan. - Mar., 1986), pp. 159–161

Historians of astronomy
American historians of science
Columbia University alumni
City University of New York faculty
City College of New York faculty
1906 births
1985 deaths
20th-century American historians
American male non-fiction writers
20th-century American male writers